The WG.22 was a proposed tiltwing convertiplane transport aircraft concept designed by Westland Aircraft in 1968, which was to be powered by four turboshaft engines.

See also
 Canadair CL-84 Dynavert
 Hiller X-18
 LTV XC-142

References

Tiltwing aircraft
Convertiplanes
High-wing aircraft
WG.22
Proposed aircraft of the United Kingdom